The Attorney General of North Carolina is a statewide elected office in the U.S. state of North Carolina. The attorney general is a constitutional officer responsible for representing state agencies in legal matters, supplying other state officials and prosecutors with legal advice, and leading the North Carolina Department of Justice. The incumbent attorney general, Josh Stein, assumed office on January 1, 2017. The position of attorney general dates back to North Carolina's colonial history. North Carolina's 1776 constitution established the office as an official appointed by the North Carolina General Assembly. The state's 1868 constitution made the attorney general an elected executive official with their duties prescribed by law. Since 1971, the officer has sat on the North Carolina Council of State.

History
The title "Attorney General" was used in the colonial territory encompassing what became North Carolina as early as 1677, when George Durant was appointed by Governor John Jenkins. In 1697 the British Crown appointed an attorney general for the entire Province of Carolina; such attorneys general would serve the entire province until it was split into the provinces North Carolina and South Carolina and both received their own attorneys general. The attorneys general in North Carolina and other British American colonies served as representatives of and exercised the same powers as the British attorneys general. The last colonial attorney general, Thomas McGuire, was appointed in 1767 and, according to the Office of the North Carolina Secretary of State, "presumably" served until the outbreak of the American Revolution.

Following the start of the revolution, the new states of the United States ratified constitutions, most of which provided for the position of attorney general. The Constitution of North Carolina, ratified on December 18, 1776, established the office in Article XIII. Under the article, the attorney general was to be appointed by the North Carolina General Assembly and to serve as long as they maintained "good behavior", similar to judges. Like other state attorneys general, North Carolina's officer exercised authority derived from English common law, colonial traditions, and state laws. The first attorney general for the independent state of North Carolina was Waightstill Avery, who served from 1777 to 1779. The General Assembly placed significant limits on the attorney general's authority, appointing their deputies and, by 1806, curtailing their ability to prosecute cases to one of six specified jurisdictions in the state.

The 1868 constitution made the attorney general an elected member of the executive branch. Under this framework, the attorney general served as the legal advisor to the North Carolina Council of State, but was not formally one of its members. The constitution made the attorney general an ex officio member of the State Board of Education and provided for the officer's duties to be determined by law. That year, the General Assembly prescribed eight statutory duties for the attorney general: defending the state's interests in legal matters, representing government agencies upon request, advising local prosecutors, delivering an annual report to the legislature, summarizing reports from local prosecutors, providing legal advice to the legislature and other government agencies, delivering funds to the state, and maintaining a record of their office's accounts. Most prosecutions for criminal offenses were made the responsibility of district solicitors.

The state's new constitution in 1971 altered the attorney general's office and duties little, though it made the officer a full member of the Council of State and removed them from the State Board of Education. The North Carolina Department of Justice—combining the Office of the Attorney General, the State Bureau of Investigation (SBI), the General Statutes Commission, and the police information network—was created by the General Assembly in 1971. In the early 1970s, incumbent Robert Burren Morgan shifted the office's emphasis from government legal matters and law enforcement towards consumer protection, and raised its political profile by forming relationships with the governor, the General Assembly, and other states' attorneys general. In 1984 a referendum approved an amendment to the constitution to require that the attorney general be licensed to practice law in North Carolina. In 2014 the SBI was removed from the attorney general's purview and made an independent agency responsible to the governor. Some attorneys general have sought the office of governor in electoral contests. The incumbent attorney general, Democrat Josh Stein, assumed office on January 1, 2017.

Powers and duties 
Article III, Section 7, of the Constitution of North Carolina stipulates the popular election of the attorney general every four years. The office holder is not subject to term limits. In the event of a vacancy in the office, the Governor of North Carolina has the authority to appoint a successor until a candidate is elected at the next general election for members of the General Assembly. Per Article III, Section 8 of the constitution, the attorney general sits on the Council of State. They are seventh in the line of succession to the governor. As with all Council of State officers, the attorney general's salary is fixed by the General Assembly and cannot be reduced during their term of office. In 2022, the attorney general's annual salary was $146,421.

The attorney general serves as the state government's top legal officer. Their duties and responsibilities are mostly enumerated in North Carolina's general statutes. Their duties include providing legal representation to all state agencies; supplying advice upon request to judges, magistrates, and county and city attorneys in accordance with the American Bar Association Model Rules of Professional Conduct; and addressing appeals to state trial court verdicts. The attorney general may initiate legal action in the public interest or intervene in proceedings before any federal and state courts, regulatory officers, agencies or bodies on behalf of the state. Per statute, the attorney general also renders nonbinding legal opinions upon questions of law submitted by the General Assembly, the governor, or any other state officer. Despite their role as top legal representative for the state, attorneys' general views are often passed over by governors, who frequently seek the advice of their appointed legal counsel. Generally, the attorney general cannot give legal advice to private entities. The General Assembly has also affirmed that the attorney general has power vested in them by common law tradition, as long as such authority is exercised in a manner consistent with state laws and the constitution. The Supreme Court of North Carolina has not delineated the scope of the officer's common law authority, though it has ruled that this bestows upon the attorney general a "duty to prosecute all actions necessary for the protection and defense of the property and revenue of the sovereign people of North Carolina." 

The Attorney General leads the North Carolina Department of Justice and appoints its director. They cannot prosecute cases themselves unless asked to do so by a local district attorney. The attorney general does not have any authority over courts, local district attorneys, or local law enforcement agencies.

List of attorneys general

Elected by the legislature

Popularly elected

Notes

References

Works cited 
 
  - See profile at Google Books

External links
 Press releases at North Carolina Attorney General

 
1777 establishments in North Carolina
North Carolina law